Kenneth "Ken" Christopher Wark (born 3 August 1961 in Sydney, New South Wales) is a former field hockey fullback from Australia, who competed in three Summer Olympics for his native country, starting in 1988. After winning the silver medal in 1992 he ended his career with the bronze medal at the 1996 Summer Olympics in Atlanta, Georgia. Ken plays for local Sydney team Glebe District Hockey Club.

Married in 1985 to Kerrie Banfield

He has three children, Kiara, Kaiden and Kameeka.

References
 Australian Olympic Committee

External links
 

1961 births
Australian male field hockey players
Olympic field hockey players of Australia
Field hockey players at the 1988 Summer Olympics
Field hockey players at the 1992 Summer Olympics
Field hockey players at the 1996 Summer Olympics
Sportspeople from Sydney
Living people
Olympic silver medalists for Australia
Olympic bronze medalists for Australia
Olympic medalists in field hockey
Medalists at the 1996 Summer Olympics
Medalists at the 1992 Summer Olympics
20th-century Australian people
Male field hockey defenders
Sportsmen from New South Wales
Field hockey people from New South Wales